Aethes moribundana is a species of moth of the family Tortricidae. It was described by Staudinger in 1859. It is found in southern and eastern Europe, Algeria, Asia Minor, Iran, Afghanistan, Central Asia, Mongolia and China (Hebei, Inner Mongolia, Qinghai, Xinjiang).

Adults are on wing in May and from July to August.

The larvae feed on Sideritis taurica.

References

moribundana
Moths described in 1859
Moths of Africa
Moths of Asia
Moths of Europe
Taxa named by Otto Staudinger